The Football League play-offs for the 1986–87 season were held in May 1987, with the two-legged finals taking place at the finalists home stadiums. The play-off semi-finals were also played over two legs and were contested by the teams who finished in 3rd, 4th and 5th place in the Football League Second Division and Football League Third Division and the 4th, 5th, 6th placed teams in the Football League Fourth Division table, along with a team from the league above. The winners of the semi-finals progressed through to the finals, with the winner of these matches either gaining promotion or avoiding relegation for the following season.

Background
The Football League play-offs have been held every year since 1987. They take place for each division following the conclusion of the regular season and are contested by the four clubs finishing below the automatic promotion places. For the first three seasons the final was played over two legs but this was changed to a single match at Wembley Stadium from 1990. Additionally, for the 1986–87 and 1987–88 play-offs the semi-finals included a team from the next league who had finished above the relegation positions up, e.g. one team from the first tier and three teams from the second tier. The team from the higher division would be relegated if they failed to win the play-offs, with the play-off winner being promoted in their place.

Second Division

First Division relegation places

Second Division play-off places

Semi-finals
First leg

Second leg

Charlton Athletic won 2–1 on aggregate.

Oldham Athletic 2–2 Leeds United on aggregate. Leeds United won on away goals.

Final

First leg

Second leg

Leeds United 1–1 Charlton Athletic on aggregate.

Replay

Third Division

Second Division relegation places

Third Division play-off places

Semi-finals
First leg

Second leg

Sunderland 6–6 Gillingham on aggregate. Gillingham won on away goals.

Swindon Town won 3–2 on aggregate.

Final

First leg

Second leg

Swindon Town 2–2 Gillingham on aggregate.

Replay

Fourth Division

Third Division relegation places

Fourth Division play-off places

Semi-finals
First leg

Second leg

Wolverhampton Wanderers won 2–0 on aggregate.

Aldershot won 3–2 on aggregate.

Final

First leg

Second leg

Aldershot won 3–0 on aggregate.

External links
Football League website

 
English Football League play-offs